Ramuntcho is a 1959 French drama film directed by Pierre Schoendoerffer and starring François Guérin, Mijanou Bardot and Gaby Morlay. It is based on Pierre Loti's 1897 novel of the same title.

Cast
 François Guérin as Ramuntcho  
 Mijanou Bardot as Gracieuse  
 Gaby Morlay as Dolorès  
 Roger Hanin as Itchoa  
 Albert Dinan as Baptistin  
 Marie Glory as Franchita  
 Moustache as L'aubergiste  
 Georges Géret as Arrochkoa  
 Colette Régis as La supériere  
 Evelyne Ker as Pantchika  
 Simone Vannier

References

Bibliography 
 Dayna Oscherwitz & MaryEllen Higgins. The A to Z of French Cinema. Scarecrow Press, 2009.

External links 
 

1959 films
1959 drama films
French drama films
1950s French-language films
Films directed by Pierre Schoendoerffer
Films based on French novels
1950s French films